Beyond The Shadows is a fantasy novel written by Brent Weeks and is the third novel in The Night Angel Trilogy.

Setting
Logan Gyre is king of Cenaria, a country under siege, with a threadbare army and little hope. He has one chance - a desperate gamble, but one that could destroy his kingdom.

In the north, the new Godking has a plan. If it comes to fruition, no one will have the power to stop him.

Kylar Stern has no choice. To save his friends-and perhaps his enemies-he must accomplish the impossible: assassinate a goddess.

Beyond the Shadows is the final book in the Night Angel Trilogy.

Novels by Brent Weeks
2008 American novels
2008 fantasy novels